Jonathan Paul "Jon" Auer (born September 29, 1969) is an American musician who co-founded the power pop band The Posies, along with Ken Stringfellow. Auer and Stringfellow also participated in the rejuvenated Big Star and in 2003 released Private Sides, a six-song split EP (Arena Rock Recording Co./Rykodisc). Auer played guitar on the 2004 William Shatner record Has Been which was produced and arranged by Ben Folds.

Auer was a founding member of Sky Cries Mary, a member of The Squirrels, Lucky Me, Jean Jacket Shotgun and Chariot. As a solo artist, his credentials include: an EP, 61/2 and a full-length record on the label Pattern25 called Songs from the Year of Our Demise. As a record producer, he has worked with bands such as You Am I, Monostereo, Cheap Star, Love Battery, Redd Kross, Truly, The Melismatics, and Tad.

Personal life 
Auer grew up in Bellingham, Washington. His father was a university professor who also played music. They built a recording studio at home, which Jon used as a teenager. Auer is three times divorced. With his previous wife, he has released an album under the name Dynamo Royale.

References 

Arena Rock Recording Company artists
American rock guitarists
American male guitarists
Living people
Big Star members
1969 births
The Minus 5 members
The Posies members
Power pop musicians
20th-century American guitarists
21st-century American guitarists